Piney Creek Ravine State Natural Area is an Illinois state park on  in Jackson and Randolph Counties, Illinois, United States.

One cliff face in the ravine contains several Native American petroglyphs, along with modern graffiti, which was added to the National Register of Historic Places in 2001.

References

State parks of Illinois
Protected areas of Randolph County, Illinois
Protected areas of Jackson County, Illinois
Protected areas established in 1972
Petroglyphs in Illinois
1972 establishments in Illinois
State Natural Areas of Illinois